The Good-Bye Kiss is a 1928 American silent comedy film directed by Mack Sennett and written by Jefferson Moffitt, Mack Sennett and Carl Harbaugh. The film stars Johnny Burke, Sally Eilers, Matty Kemp, Wheeler Oakman, Irving Bacon and Lionel Belmore. The film was released on July 8, 1928, by First National Pictures.

Cast      
Johnny Burke as Johnny
Sally Eilers as Sally
Matty Kemp as Bill Williams
Wheeler Oakman as Sergeant Hoffman
Irving Bacon as Colonel Von Stein
Lionel Belmore as The General
Alma Bennett as Toots
Carmelita Geraghty as Mademoiselle Nannette
Eugene Pallette as The Captain
Jean Laverty as Mademoiselle Jeanne
Andy Clyde as The Grandfather

References

External links
 

1928 films
1920s English-language films
Silent American comedy films
1928 comedy films
First National Pictures films
Films directed by Mack Sennett
American silent feature films
American black-and-white films
1920s American films